The Sydney 40 was designed by Iain Murray and built by Sydney Yachts in the late 1990s.

History
The Sydney 40 was chosen from the design board by the Royal Ocean Racing Club to become the new One Design class for the Admiral's Cup. The class never really took off for a variety of reasons this led to the failure of the management company Race 1. The boat had a highly tunable rig and was hard to sail well rewarding the most experience crews. The class was allowed to hold a World Championship by the International Sailing Federation for two years early on in its existence.

Events

World Champions

Admiral's Cup

Sailing yachts
Former classes of World Sailing
1990s sailboat type designs
Sailboat types built by Sydney Yachts